"Hearts on Fire" is a song by Swedish heavy metal band HammerFall released as their single on 30 September 2002. It was the only single released from their fourth studio album, Crimson Thunder. It ranked 11th in the Swedish charts and 58th in Germany.

The cover artwork was created by Samwise Didier.

A promotional DVD, also titled Hearts on Fire, was released by Nuclear Blast on 4 November 2002. It ranked 9th in the Swedish charts.

Track list

CD
From Metal Archives.

DVD
From the song's web page.

Bonus materials DVD: photo gallery

Personnel
Joacim Cans    – lead vocals
Oscar Dronjak  – rhythm guitar, backing vocals
Stefan Elmgren – lead guitar
Magnus Rosén   – bass
Anders Johansson – drums

Guest Performers
Mat Sinner and Rolf Köhler – additional backing vocals on Hearts On Fire (both CD and DVD)

Release information
An orange 12" vinyl, 12", maxi-single, limited edition was released with three tracks on the LP. On side A; "Hearts on Fire" and on side B; "We're Gonna Make It (Twisted Sister cover) and "Heeding The Call (live)".
The Japanese release is an enhanced version of the single and came out on 21 September 2002. It has all the tracks from the original release with three additional tracks: "Rising Force" (originally performed by Yngwie Malmsteen), "Templars Of Steel (live)" and "Let The Hammer Fall (live)".

References

External links
Official HammerFall website
Single Information
Single & DVD Cover
Lyrics on Darklyrics

2002 songs
HammerFall songs
Nuclear Blast Records singles
2002 singles
Songs written by Joacim Cans
Songs written by Oscar Dronjak